Frederick Williams (born 1873) was an English footballer. His regular position was as a forward. He was born in Manchester. He played for Hanley Swifts, South Shore, Manchester City, and Manchester United.

References

External links
MUFCInfo.com profile

1873 births
English footballers
Manchester United F.C. players
Manchester City F.C. players
Year of death missing
Association football forwards